The Cerro Bandera is a hill located on Navarino Island, is visible from Puerto Williams and its top is a flag of Chile, takes about 3 hours to travel back and forth. It is also the first stop to continue the circuit Dientes de Navarino.

See also 
 Puerto Williams

References 

Hills of Chile
Navarino Island